The Montagne de l'Épaule (English: Mountain of the Shoulder) peaks at  in Jacques-Cartier National Park, in the municipality of Stoneham-et-Tewkesbury , in La Jacques-Cartier Regional County Municipality, in the administrative region of Capitale-Nationale, in Quebec, Canada.

Geography 
The summit of the shoulder mountain is located at:
  east of the Jacques-Cartier River;
  north of the confluence of the Rivière à l'Épaule and the Jacques-Cartier River;
  east of the village center of Stoneham-et-Tewkesbury;
  north-west of route 175.

The Montagne de l'Épaule is wedged between the Jacques-Cartier River which flows on the west side and the Rivière à l'Épaule which is on the east side.

Mountain path 
This trail begins at km 3, one of the first trails near the entrance to the Jacques-Cartier National Park which is located at 103 chemin du Parc-National in Stoneham-et-Tewkesbury. From the parking lot, after walking a hundred meters along the road, hikers enter the forest until the intersection. Hikers can then choose to take the gradual climb or a steeper climb.

On this well-laid out route, hikers can admire the Jacques-Cartier river valley. Several well-located information panels tell snippets of the history of the Laurentians. On the crest of Montagne de l'Épaule, hikers meet the summit between the slopes of Jacques-Cartier and Rivière à l'Épaule.

History 
In the past, the Rivière à l'Épaule and the Jacques-Cartier River were used to float the logs to the sawmills downstream.

Toponymy 
The toponym "montagne de l'Épaule" is linked to the toponym of the river of the same name.

The toponym "montagne de l'Épaule" was formalized on August 2, 1974, at the Place Names Bank of the Commission de toponymie du Québec.

References

See also 
 La Jacques-Cartier Regional County Municipality
 Stoneham-et-Tewkesbury, a municipality
 Jacques-Cartier National Park
 Rivière à l'Épaule
 Jacques-Cartier River
 Lac Jacques-Cartier Massif

Landforms of Capitale-Nationale
La Jacques-Cartier Regional County Municipality